Elizabeth Almada is a Paralympian athlete from Argentina competing mainly in category F12-13 throwing events.

She competed in the 2008 Summer Paralympics in Beijing, China. There she won a bronze medal in the women's F12-13 discus throw event.  She also competed in the women's F12-13 shot put.

External links
 IPC profile and results

Paralympic athletes of Argentina
Athletes (track and field) at the 2008 Summer Paralympics
Paralympic bronze medalists for Argentina
Living people
Year of birth missing (living people)
Medalists at the 2008 Summer Paralympics
Paralympic medalists in athletics (track and field)